HMS Cooke (K471) was a British Captain-class frigate of the Royal Navy in commission during World War II. Originally constructed as the United States Navy Evarts-class destroyer escort USS Dempsey (DE-267), she served in the Royal Navy from 1943 to 1946.

Construction and transfer
The ship was laid down as the U.S. Navy destroyer escort USS Dempsey (DE-267), the first ship of the name, by the Boston Navy Yard in Boston, Massachusetts, on 11 March 1943 and launched on 22 April 1943, sponsored by Mrs. J. A. Dempsey, mother of the late Lieutenant, junior grade Richard John Dempsey (1919-1942), for whom the ship was named. Dempsey was transferred to the United Kingdom under Lend-Lease upon completion on 23 August 1943.

Service history

Commissioned into service in the Royal Navy as HMS Cooke (K471) on 23 August 1943 simultaneously with her transfer, the ship served on patrol and escort duty. On 26 July 1944, she sank the German submarine U-214 with depth charges in the English Channel southeast of the Eddystone Rocks in position .

The Royal Navy returned Cooke to the U.S. Navy on 5 March 1946.

Disposal
The United States sold Cooke on 3 or 10 June 1947 (sources vary) for scrapping.

References

Navsource Online: Destroyer Escort Photo Archive DE-267 Dempsey HMS Cooke (K-471)
uboat.net HMS Cooke (K 471)
Captain Class Frigate Association HMS Cooke K471 (DE 267)

External links
 Photo gallery of HMS Dempsey (DE-267)

 

Captain-class frigates
Evarts-class destroyer escorts
World War II frigates of the United Kingdom
World War II frigates and destroyer escorts of the United States
Ships built in Boston
1943 ships